Between Friends is a 1973 Canadian crime film directed by Donald Shebib. It was entered into the 23rd Berlin International Film Festival, and was featured in the Canadian Cinema television series which aired on CBC Television in 1974.

Plot 
A botched mine robbery in Northern Ontario involves the troubled quartet of Chino (Chuck Shamata), his American surfing buddy Toby (Michael Parks), his girlfriend's father (Henry Beckman) and Coker (Hugh Webster). While the robbery is being planned, Chino's girlfriend Ellie (Bonnie Bedelia) becomes attracted to Toby.

Cast
 Michael Parks as Toby
 Bonnie Bedelia as Ellie
 Chuck Shamata as Chino
 Henry Beckman as Will
 Hugh Webster as Coker

Reception
Though Between Friends was a commercial failure for director Shebib, it is "easily his most critically applauded film", some critics going so far as to call it his masterpiece. Wyndham Wise called it "a taut, serious dramatic study of loyalty, Canada/US relations and the limitations of male bonding", and asserted the failed heist sequence rivals any American film noir.

The film was a finalist for Best Picture at the Canadian Film Awards in 1973, losing to Slipstream.

References

External links

1973 films
1973 crime drama films
1970s English-language films
Canadian crime drama films
Canadian independent films
English-language Canadian films
Films directed by Donald Shebib
Films shot in Greater Sudbury
Films set in Northern Ontario
Greater Sudbury in fiction
1970s Canadian films